The Order of Dr. Sun Yat-sen is a civilian order of the Republic of China that was instituted in 1941. It is given in commemoration of Sun Yat-sen, and as a token of thanks to those who make outstanding contributions to the Republic of China. It has only been awarded four times: twice in 1944 to Cheng Chao and Chung Yu, associates of Sun Yat-sen, and subsequently to Vice Presidents of the Republic of China, Annette Lu in 2008, followed by Chen Chien-jen in 2020.

References

External links 

Orders, decorations, and medals of the Republic of China
Awards established in 1941